Samiyan may refer to:
Semichi Islands
Samian, Iran

See also
Samiyam